Elsa Asunción Cirigliano Martínez was a Venezuelan woman, wife of former President Fernando Romeo Lucas García.

She was secretly married on October 12, 1978 with Fernando Romeo Lucas García, in the Presidential House, months after he assumed the Presidency of Guatemala. After the events that led to the overthrow of her husband, they fled to Venezuela where they remained until the death of Romeo Lucas García in 2006.

References

1934 births
Year of death missing
First ladies of Guatemala
People from Anzoátegui